Marion Bartoli was the defending champion, but lost in the second round against Émilie Loit.

Jelena Janković won the title, beating Vera Zvonareva 7–6(11–9), 5–7, 6–3 in the final.

Draw

Seeds

Finals

Top half

Bottom half

References

WTA Auckland Open